Peschetius is a genus of beetles in the family Dytiscidae, containing the following species:

 Peschetius aethiopicus Omer-Cooper, 1964
 Peschetius carinipennis (Régimbart, 1895)
 Peschetius nigeriensis Omer-Cooper, 1970
 Peschetius nodieri (Régimbart, 1895)
 Peschetius parvus Omer-Cooper, 1970
 Peschetius quadricostatus (Aubé, 1838)
 Peschetius sudanensis Omer-Cooper, 1970
 Peschetius toxophorus Guignot, 1942
 Peschetius ultimus Biström & Nilsson, 2003

References

Dytiscidae